This is a list of noted footballers who have played for Flamengo whether or not they have a Wikipedia article. Players who have made significant/notable contribution to the club are included.

Players in bold currently still play for the club.
Including friendlies and non-official matches.

List of players

Statistics correct as of match played 12 November 2022.

Other players
 Although he was never a Flamengo player, Pelé played a single friendly match on 6 April 1979.
 Arthur Friedenreich played two official matches in 1935 at 43 years old.
 In the twilight of his career, Garrincha played five official matches in 1968–69.

See also
Category: Flamengo players

References

External links
 Clube de Regatas do Flamengo (official website)

Lists of association football players by club in Brazil
P
P
Association football player non-biographical articles